Mark Potsic, better known by his stage name DJ Nu-Mark (born June 10, 1971), is an American hip hop producer and DJ. He is a member of Jurassic 5, as well as the owner of Hot Plate Records. He has collaborated with and produced for a variety of artists across different genres, including J-Live, Aloe Blacc, Charles Bradley, and Bumpy Knuckles, among others.

In 2004, the Hands On mixtape was released on Sequence Records. In 2012, DJ Nu-Mark released the album titled Broken Sunlight on Hot Plate Records. In 2014, Slimkid3 & DJ Nu-Mark, his collaborative album with Slimkid3, was released by Delicious Vinyl.

Discography

Studio albums
 Blend Crafters Volume One (2004, with Pomo)
 Broken Sunlight (2012)
 Slimkid3 & DJ Nu-Mark (2014, with Slimkid3)
 TRDMRK (2019)
 Run For Cover (2021)

Mixtapes
 Hands On (2004)
 Take Me with You (2011)

EPs
 Broken Sunlight Series 1 (2012)
 Broken Sunlight Series 2 (2012)
 Broken Sunlight Series 3 (2012)
 Broken Sunlight Series 4 (2012)
 Broken Sunlight Series 5 (2012)
 Broken Sunlight Series 6 (2012)
 ‘’Trademark EP’’ (2018)

Singles
 "Chali 2na Comin' Thru" b/w "Brand Nu Live" (2004)
 "Imagine" (2004, with Pomo)
 "Lola" b/w "Unwind" (2004, with Pomo)
 "Oyá Indeburê" b/w "Tough Break" (2013)
 "Our Generation" (2013)
 "Bom Bom Fiya" b/w "Bouillon" (2014, with Slimkid3)
 "I Know, Didn't I" b/w "No Pity Party" (2014, with Slimkid3)
 "King" b/w "Let Me Hit" (2014, with Slimkid3)

Productions
 Mannish – "Speaker Time" from Audio Sedative (1995)
 J-Live – "The Zone" from Then What Happened? (2008)
 Hilltop Hoods – "Classic Example" from State of the Art (2009)
 Chali 2na – "Comin' Thru" and "Graff Time" from Fish Outta Water (2009)
 The Lonely Island – "The Old Saloon" and "Punch You in the Jeans" from Incredibad (2009)
 The Lonely Island – "Rocky" from Turtleneck & Chain (2011)
 Slimkid3 – Another Day Another Dollar (2011)
 The Lonely Island – "Spell It Out" and "I Don't Give a Honk" from The Wack Album (2013)
 Chinese Man – "Sho-Bro (DJ Nu-Mark Remix)" (2015)

References

External links
 
 

Hip hop record producers
American hip hop DJs
Living people
Jurassic 5 members
1971 births